is a city located in Yamaguchi Prefecture, Japan, which was incorporated on July 1, 1932.

History

In the medieval period, Hagi was dominated by the Yoshimi clan, who built Hagi Castle, the ruins of which can be visited today. The Mōri clan became daimyōs of Chōshū Domain at the beginning of the Edo period and built Hagi Castle at the foot of Mt. Shizuki in 1608. They transferred the capital of the domain from Hiroshima to Hagi at the same time. Hagi then developed as the political center of Chōshū for over 250 years.

When the Meiji Restoration came about in the 1860s, as the result of efforts by samurai from Chōshū and a number of other domains, this small city gained great historical significance. Many Japanese statesmen and Prime Ministers were born and brought up in this city.

On March 6, 2005, Hagi absorbed the towns of Susa and Tamagawa, and the villages of Asahi, Fukue, Kawakami and Mutsumi (all from Abu District) to create the new, expanded city of Hagi.

Population
One of the factors underlying the continual decrease of population is said to be its poor public transport. Industry did not grow at all and the rapid economic growth of Japan only caused the town to decline. But it also kept the traditions alive and the traditional look of the town preserved.

Climate
Hagi has a humid subtropical climate (Köppen Cfa) with hot, humid and wet summers combined with cool to mild winters, with a relatively high precipitation amount compared to mainland Asian locations on similar latitudes.

Economy 
Iwami Airport in nearby Masuda, Shimane Prefecture serves Hagi.

Tourism is a strong factor of the town.

Military
Hagi is home to the Ground Self-Defense Force's Mutsumi Training Area, and is a proposed installation site for the Aegis Ashore missile defense system.

Hagi Pottery (Hagiyaki)

The city was the capital of the Chōshū Domain during the Edo period (ca. 1603–1868). Hagi is renowned for Hagi ware, a form of Japanese pottery dating from 1604 when two Korean potters were brought to Hagi by Lord Mōri Terumoto.

Hagi was also the location for an International Sculpture Symposium in 1981.  Twenty-six international sculptors worked together to create a seaside park. They created many functional sculptures, including tables and benches.

People

 Yoshida Shōin (1830-1859), intellectual, teacher and revolutionary
Inoue Masaru, known as the "Father of the Japanese Railways".
Katsura Taro, former prime minister of Japan.
Kido Takayoshi
Omura Masujiro
Takasugi Shinsaku
Tanaka Giichi, former prime minister of Japan.
Yamagata Aritomo, former prime minister of Japan.

Sister cities
Since 1968, Hagi has been a sister city to Ulsan, South Korea.

References

Further reading

External links

 HAGI Sightseeing Guide (tourism website run by Hagi Tourism Association) (English) 
 Hagi City official website 
 
 

 
Cities in Yamaguchi Prefecture